is a Japanese actress who is a member of the Mingei Theatre Company.

In 1966, she played the protagonist in the NHK morning drama (Asadora) series Ohanahan. She has also performed in other television dramas and comedy films such as the role of Reiko in Tora-san, the Intellectual. Kashiyama is married to the actor Masahiko Watahiki.

Anime dubbing roles 
Hans Christian Andersen's The Little Mermaid (1975) – Marina
Anne no Nikki (Special) (1979) – Narrator
Anne no Nikki (Movie) (1995) – Edith Frank-Holländer

Television and film roles
Ohanahan (1966) – Asao
Chikadō no Taiyō Made (1968) – Yuki
Koto no Taiyo (1968) – Hatsuko Araki
Kunitori Monogatari (1973) – Yamauchi Chiyo
Tora-san, the Intellectual (Part of the series Otoko wa Tsurai yo) (1975) – Reiko
Kodomo no Koro Senso ga Atta (1981) – Kazue Hasuike
Furusato (1983) – Hana
Dauntaun Hirozu (1988) – Kimiko Masaoka
San-nen B-gumi Kinpachi Sensei 3 (1988)
Tabi no Okurimono 0:00 Hatsu (2006)
Tsuru Akira: Kokoro no Kiseki (2009)
Mio on the Shore (2019)

Stage acting roles 
 The Seagull (by Anton Chekov)

References

External links 
 

1941 births
Living people
Actresses from Tokyo
Japanese film actresses
Japanese stage actresses
Japanese television actresses
Japanese voice actresses
20th-century Japanese actresses
21st-century Japanese actresses
Asadora lead actors